

Semi-finalist summary

14 acts perform each week, five of whom will make it through to the final. Each judge can buzz an act in the semi-finals. If an act receives four buzzers, it will be ended, but the public can still vote at home.

Semi-final rounds

Semi-Final 1

Semi-Final 2 

 Alberto De Paz accidentally had a x by Jorge J; even though he didn't even press the button, it showed up before the act even started.

Semi-Final 3

Semi-Final 4

Final
The final was broadcast on 28 April 2016.

References

Spain
2016 Spanish television seasons